David Chevallereau (born April 10, 1969, in Saintes, Charente-Maritime, France) is a former professional footballer. He played as a goalkeeper and made one Ligue 2 appearance for Niort in 1990.

External links
David Chevallereau profile at chamoisfc79.fr

1969 births
Living people
People from Saintes, Charente-Maritime
French footballers
Association football goalkeepers
Chamois Niortais F.C. players
La Roche VF players
Ligue 2 players
Luçon FC players
Sportspeople from Charente-Maritime
Footballers from Nouvelle-Aquitaine